Hypoluxo is a town in Palm Beach County, Florida, United States. The population was 2,588 at the 2010 census. As of 2018, the population recorded by the U.S. Census Bureau was 2,783. Hypoluxo Scrub Natural Area is a protected landscape.

Etymology 

The origin of the name "Hypoluxo" is disputed. One theory analyzed the name as composed of the Greek root "hypo-" (under, below average) and the Latin "lux" (light). Hannibel Pierce settled on Hypoluxo Island with his family in 1873. His son, Charlie W. Pierce reported that a Seminole woman told his mother that the Seminole name for Lake Worth was Hypoluxo, which he thought meant 'island', or as he put it using his marginal command of the English language: "water all around, no get out". The name that the Pierces wrote as "Hypoluxo" was given as "Opoloccha" in a history posted by the Town of Hypluxo. J. Clarence Simpson, citing William A. Read, states that the name is from the Creek-Seminole Hapo, meaning "mound" and Plotski, meaning "round", thus "round mound". The name "Hypoluxo" appears on an 1841 War Department map.

History

The area that is now the Town of Hypoluxo was first settled in 1884 by Andrew Walton Garnett, James Edward Hamilton and James William Porter. Gannett and Hamilton carried the mail between the Lake Worth area and Miami as barefoot mailmen.

Geography

Hypoluxo is located at  (26.562897, –80.052339). The town is on the mainland shore of Lake Worth and does not include any of Hypoluxo Island.

Demographics

2020 census

As of the 2020 United States census, there were 2,687 people, 1,388 households, and 717 families residing in the town.

2000 census
As of the census of 2000, there were 2,015 people, 1,112 households, and 549 families residing in the town. The racial makeup of the town was 90.62% White (87.8% were Non-Hispanic White,) 4.22% African American, 0.10% Native American, 1.74% Asian, 0.99% from other races, and 2.33% from two or more races. Hispanic or Latino of any race were 4.57% of the population.

There were 1,112 households, out of which 9.8% had children under the age of 18 living with them, 41.7% were married couples living together, 5.7% had a female householder with no husband present, and 50.6% were non-families. 39.0% of all households were made up of individuals, and 11.5% had someone living alone who was 65 years of age or older.  The average household size was 1.81 and the average family size was 2.33.

In the town, the population was spread out, with 8.8% under the age of 18, 4.8% from 18 to 24, 30.3% from 25 to 44, 30.6% from 45 to 64, and 25.6% who were 65 years of age or older.  The median age was 49 years. For every 100 females, there were 96.0 males.  For every 100 females age 18 and over, there were 92.0 males.

The median income for a household in the town was $50,284, and the median income for a family was $64,375. Males had a median income of $50,431 versus $32,647 for females. The per capita income for the town was $43,960.  About 8.6% of families and 7.1% of the population were below the poverty line, including 10.5% of those under age 18 and 5.5% of those age 65 or over.

As of 2000, English as a first language accounted for 86.65% of all residents, while the mother tongues of French comprised 5.38%, Finnish consisted of 4.52%, Spanish was at 2.42%, and Italian made up 1.02% of the population.

As of 2000, Hypoluxo had the twelfth highest percentage of Canadian residents in the US (tied with four other US areas,) which accounted 5.40% of all residents, while it can be assumed that because of the percentage of Finnish speakers, Finns were around 4.52% of town's population.

Controversies

The city government of Hypoluxo claims that certain streets, particularly in Hypoluxo Park, have a "public designation" but are not maintained by the city. As a result, some areas are maintained neither by the city nor any neighborhood association. For example, a seawall on the Intracoastal Waterway in Hypoluxo Park failed in 2019, leading to a dispute over whether the city would pay for repairs.

References

External links 

Hypoluxo official website

Towns in Palm Beach County, Florida
Towns in Florida
Populated places on the Intracoastal Waterway in Florida